William Robertson (1786 – 12 June 1841) was a Scottish architect. Born in Lonmay in Aberdeenshire, he started his career in Cullen, Moray, then moved to Elgin around 1821, where he practised for the rest of his life. He established himself as the foremost architect of his period north of Aberdeen, described by Charles McKean as "possibly the north of Scotland's first native classical architect of substance." His practice was continued by his nephews Alexander and William Reid, and then by their partners and successors J and W Wittet.

Robertson built numerous churches, for the Church of Scotland, the Episcopal Church of Scotland and for the newly emancipated Roman Catholic Church, including the Category A listed St Thomas's in Keith, which he designed with Walter Lovi.  He also improved numerous country houses around Morayshire and Banffshire, such as Milton Brodie House, and he built Aberlour House from scratch, for the rich slave-owner and planter Alexander Grant. In 1826, he published a book, entitled A Series of Views of the Ruins of Elgin Cathedral … with ground plan and table of measurements.

He died at Elgin on 12 June 1841, and is commemorated by a memorial in the graveyard at Elgin Cathedral.

References 

1786 births
1841 deaths
19th-century Scottish architects